Trostianets Raion may refer to:

Trostianets Raion, Vinnytsia Oblast, a raion of Ukraine in Vinnytsia Oblast
Trostianets Raion, Sumy Oblast, a raion of Ukraine in Sumy Oblast